The LN postcode area, also known as the Lincoln postcode area, is a group of thirteen postcode districts in England, which are subdivisions of seven post towns. These cover central Lincolnshire, including Lincoln, Alford, Horncastle, Louth, Mablethorpe, Market Rasen and Woodhall Spa.



Coverage
The approximate coverage of the postcode districts:

|-
! LN1
| LINCOLN
| Saxilby, Stow, Sturton, City Centre
| Lincoln, West Lindsey
|-
! LN2
| LINCOLN
| Nettleham, Ermine & St Giles Estates, Welton, Sudbrooke, Dunholme, Grange de Lings.
| Lincoln, West Lindsey
|-
! LN3
| LINCOLN
| Fiskerton, Cherry Willingham, Lincoln, Bardney, Reepham
| Lincoln, West Lindsey, North Kesteven, 
|-
! LN4
| LINCOLN
| Branston, Canwick, Coningsby, Dunston, Heighington, Nocton, Washingborough, Timberland, Martin, Ashby de la Launde, Scopwick, Holland Fen, Metheringham
| Lincoln, North Kesteven, East Lindsey, Boston
|-
! LN5
| LINCOLN
| Waddington
| Lincoln, North Kesteven
|-
! LN6
| LINCOLN
| North Hykeham, South Hykeham, Birchwood, Skellingthorpe, Doddington, Whisby, Eagle, North Scarle, Thorpe on the Hill, Witham St Hughs, Swinderby, Norton Disney, Stapleford
| Lincoln, North Kesteven
|-
! LN7
| MARKET RASEN
| Nettleton, Caistor
| West Lindsey, North Lincolnshire
|-
! LN8
| MARKET RASEN
|Market Rasen
| West Lindsey, East Lindsey, North East Lincolnshire
|-
! LN9
| HORNCASTLE
| Horncastle, Tetford, Salmonby, Minting, Belchford, West Ashby, Hemingby, Baumber, Low Toynton, High Toynton, Fulletby, Greetham, Ashby Puerorum, Edlington, Wispington, Mareham on the Hill, Haltham, Winceby, Hameringham, Dalderby, Thornton, Langton, Old Woodhall, Oxcombe, Scrafield
| East Lindsey
|-
! LN10
| WOODHALL SPA
| Woodhall Spa, Kirkstead, Roughton, Bucknall, Horsington, Kirkby on Bain, Stixwould
| East Lindsey, North Kesteven
|-
! LN11
| LOUTH
|Louth
| East Lindsey
|-
! LN12
| MABLETHORPE
| Mablethorpe, Sutton-on-Sea, Theddlethorpe
| East Lindsey
|-
! LN13
| ALFORD
| 
| East Lindsey
|}

Map

See also
Postcode Address File
List of postcode areas in the United Kingdom

References

External links
Royal Mail's Postcode Address File
A quick introduction to Royal Mail's Postcode Address File (PAF)

Lincoln, England
Postcode areas covering the East Midlands